Scilla lochiae, known as Loch's glory-of-the-snow, is a bulbous perennial from Cyprus flowering in early spring. After flowering, it goes into dormancy until the next spring. It was named after Lady Loch who collected it. It belongs to a group of Scilla species that were formerly put in a separate genus, Chionodoxa, which may now be treated as Scilla sect. Chionodoxa.

Like all former Chionodoxa species, the bases of the stamens are flattened and closely clustered in the middle of the flower. In other species of Scilla, the stamens are not flattened or clustered together.

S. lochiae is an endemic of the Toodos Mountains of Cyprus, where it flowers during March and April in moist organic soils in pine forests at higher elevations. Found only in a small area, it is strictly protected under the Berne Convention.

It has relatively few flowers in a raceme, each about 2.5 cm in diameter. The flowers are bright blue, without white at the base of the tepals, as most other former Chionodoxa species have, although the stamen bases are white. Photographs taken in the wild show the flowers nodding rather than upright.

Notes and references

Bibliography
 
 
 

lochiae
Flora of Cyprus
Ephemeral plants